Aaron Bailey may refer to:

Aaron Bailey (American football) (born 1971), American football player 
Aaron Bailey, police officer killed by Barker-Karpis gang
 Aaron Bailey (Full House), fictional character on American sitcom Full House

See also
Aaron Bayley, artist from the UK series Pop Idol: The Big Band Album
Aaron Bailey-Nowell (born 1981), New Zealand basketball player